Marc Pfister (born 26 September 1989) is a Swiss curler from Schalunen.

Curling career
As a junior curler, Pfister played third for Switzerland (skipped by David Bartschiger) at the 2009 World Junior Curling Championships, where they finished sixth.

Pfister competed at the 2015 Ford World Men's Curling Championship in Halifax, Nova Scotia, Canada, as skip for the Swiss national curling team. The Swiss team had a great start at the tournament, but lost their last five games. These last five consecutive losses placed the young Swiss team at 5–6 after the round robin, finishing 7th. Also that season, Pfister and partner Carole Howald competed at the 2015 World Mixed Doubles Curling Championship, placing in 13th overall.

Sven Michel joined the team in 2015 to skip the rink. They would play in three Grand Slams, missing the playoffs in all of them. Pfister returned to the Worlds in 2016, on this team. The team had another disappointing tournament, going 4–7 and finishing 9th. After the season, Pfister took over as the skip of the team with Michel leaving them.

Pfister skipped the Swiss team again at the 2018 World Men's Curling Championship. He led his team to a 6–6 record, in 7th place. They narrowly missed the playoffs, as they had the same record as the United States, but missed the playoffs by virtue of losing their last round robin game to the Americans who qualified in their stead. That season, Team Pfister won the German Masters which would qualify for them to play in the 2018 Humpty's Champions Cup, Pfister's first Grand Slam event as a skip. There, he went winless, missing the playoffs.

Grand Slam record

References

External links

1989 births
Living people
Swiss male curlers
People from Bern-Mittelland District
People from Emmental District
Swiss curling champions
Sportspeople from the canton of Bern